Antti Kanervo (born 12 April 1989) is a Finnish professional basketball player for the Helsinki Seagulls of the Finnish Korisliiga and the Finnish national basketball team.

Playing career

Professional career
Kanervo started his career at Huänen in Äänekoski. He moved to BC Jyväskylä in spring 2007 and hit himself in the following season. In the last match of the season, he scored 64 points and earned 21.1 points throughout the season. For the 2008–2009 season, Kanervo signed a two year contract with Kouvot in the Finnish top-tier Korisliiga. He played two season for the club and won the bronze medal in 2010. Kanervo moved with coach Jukka Toijala after Joensuu's junior season 2009–2010.

In June 2016, Kanervo signed with Chorale Roanne Basket of the LNB Pro B.

In August 2018, Kanervo signed with Stjarnan of the Icelandic Úrvalsdeild karla. On 13 December 2018, he scored a season high 40 points in Stjarnan victory against UMF Grindavík. On 16 February 2019, he helped Stjarnan win the Icelandic Cup, scoring 11 points in the team's 84-68 victory against Njarðvík in the Cup finals. During the regular season, Kanervo averaged 17.5 points per game, helping Stjarnan post the best record in the league and a home court advantage through the playoffs.

On 29 March 2019, Kanervo was hit by coins thrown by a fan in Grindavík in the closing seconds of Stjarnan's playoffs victory against UMF Grindavík.

He helped Stjarnan reach the semi-finals in the playoffs where they unexpectedly lost to 7th seeded ÍR. In 9 playoffs games, Kanervo averaged 15.7 points per game while making 39 percent of his three point shots.

On 22 July 2019, Kanervo returned to Finland signing with Helsinki Seagulls for the 2019–20 season.

National team career
Kanervo debuted with the Finnish national basketball team in 2010.

Awards, titles and achievements

Titles
Icelandic Cup:
2019
Finnish Cup (2):
 2011, 2012

Awards
Finnish D1 MVP:
2008

References

External links
Icelandic statistics at kki.is
Profile at realgm.com

1989 births
Living people
Finnish expatriate basketball people in Iceland
Finnish men's basketball players
Helsinki Seagulls players
Shooting guards
Antti Kanervo
Antti Kanervo
People from Äänekoski
Sportspeople from Central Finland